Maracá-Jipioca Ecological Station is an ecological station covering two islands about  offshore from Amapá, a municipality in Amapá state, Brazil. It protects an area of coastal mangroves and tropical rainforest.

Location

The reserve was created by decree of 2 June 1981 with the objective of preserving significant samples of the original coastal marine environment influenced by the Amazon river.
It is part of the Amazon biosphere.
It is managed by the Chico Mendes Institute for Biodiversity Conservation.
The reserve is in the Amapá municipality of Amapá state.
It is part of the Amapá Biodiversity Corridor, created in 2003.

Environment

Average annual rainfall is 
The climate is a tropical monsoon climate (Am) with moderate to little rainfall from August to November and heavy to extremely heavy rainfall in the remaining months.

The shoreline and stream banks are dominated by mangroves, with typical floodplain species of trees in the more elevated areas.
The coastal vegetation is in the Amapá mangroves ecoregion.

Due to the difficulty of motorized access the unit has excellent biodiversity with many species, some of them endangered.
The reserve is used by many migratory birds including American flamingo (Phoenicopterus ruber), American yellow warbler (Setophaga petechia), laughing gull (Leucophaeus atricilla), semipalmated plover (Charadrius semipalmatus), greater yellowlegs (Tringa melanoleuca), osprey (Pandion haliaetus), spotted sandpiper (Actitis macularius), peregrine falcon (Falco peregrinus), ruddy turnstone (Arenaria interpres), sanderling (Calidris alba), semipalmated sandpiper (Calidris pusilla), least tern (Sternula antillarum), common tern (Sterna hirundo), yellow-billed cuckoo (Coccyzus americanus), black-billed cuckoo (Coccyzus erythropthalmus) and barn swallow (Hirundo rustica).

Conservation

The Ecological Station is a "strict nature reserve" under IUCN protected area category Ia.
The purpose is to conserve significant samples of pioneer formations in the coastal marine environment influenced by the Amazon River.
The conservation unit is supported by the Amazon Region Protected Areas Program.

References

Sources

 

1981 establishments in Brazil
Ecological stations of Brazil
Protected areas of Amapá
Protected areas established in 1981